The common scimitarbill (Rhinopomastus cyanomelas) is a species of bird in the family Phoeniculidae.
It is found in Angola, Botswana, Burundi, Democratic Republic of the Congo, Eswatini, Kenya, Malawi, Mozambique, Namibia, Rwanda, Somalia, South Africa, Tanzania, Uganda, Zambia, and Zimbabwe.

Description 
Adults are dark blue. As adults, their beaks are black but as juveniles, their beaks are grey.

References

External links
 (Scimitarbilled woodhoopoe=) Common scimitarbill – Species text in The Atlas of Southern African Birds.

common scimitarbill
common scimitarbill
Taxa named by Louis Jean Pierre Vieillot
Taxonomy articles created by Polbot